Each year between 1870 and 1955 the Parliament of the United Kingdom passed an Isle of Man (Customs) Act to impose customs duties on goods imported into the Isle of Man.

The Isle of Man Customs, Harbours, and Public Purposes Act 1866 (an Act of Parliament) passed power to the Manx Government to collect and retain customs duties, and the Isle of Man Treasury was created in that year as a result, with John Clucas as the first Treasurer.

The Isle of Man (Customs) Act 1887 empowered Tynwald with the power to alter the rates of customs duties with temporary effect, subject to confirmation by the annual Acts of Parliament. The Isle of Man (Customs) Act 1955 substituted confirmation by Order in Council, thereby ending the requirement for these Acts to be passed annually. The Isle of Man Act 1958 finally gave the island's insular legislature, Tynwald, the power to pass laws to impose such duties without requiring any confirmation.

See also
 List of Acts of the Parliament of the United Kingdom, 1820–1839

References 

Manx law
Acts of the Parliament of the United Kingdom
Acts of the Parliament of the United Kingdom concerning the Isle of Man
Isle of Man–United Kingdom relations